The 54th Baeksang Arts Awards ceremony was held on May 3, 2018, at Hall D, COEX in Seoul. Hosted by Shin Dong-yup, Bae Suzy and Park Bo-gum, it was broadcast live on JTBC. Organised by Ilgan Sports and JTBC Plus, it is South Korea's only awards ceremony which recognises excellence in both film and television.

The highest honors of the night, Grand Prize (Daesang), were awarded to the film 1987: When the Day Comes in the film division and the drama series Stranger in the television division.

Winners and nominees 
Winners are listed first and highlighted in boldface.
Nominees

Film

Television

Special awards

References

External links 
  
 

Baeksang
Baeksang
Baeksang Arts Awards
Baek
Baek
2010s in Seoul
2018 in South Korea